The melon barb (Haludaria fasciata) is a common species of cyprinid fish that is endemic to rivers in Goa, Karnataka, Kerala and Tamil Nadu in the Western Ghats of South India. This species can also be found in the aquarium trade.

The melon barb is an open water, substrate egg-scatterer, and adults do not guard the eggs.

See also
List of freshwater aquarium fish species

References 

melon barb
Freshwater fish of India
Endemic fauna of the Western Ghats
Fauna of South India
melon barb
Taxa named by Thomas C. Jerdon